Druid Arch is an iconic 150-foot tall Cedar Mesa Sandstone arch located within the Needles District of Canyonlands National Park, in San Juan County, Utah. It is situated at the head of Elephant Canyon, and precipitation runoff from Druid Arch drains north into the nearby Colorado River via Elephant Canyon. Druid Arch is one of the most popular hiking destinations in the Needles district. A 5.4 mile hike to Druid Arch starts at the Elephant Hill Trailhead, and the final quarter-mile is steep with some scrambling and one ladder. The name comes from its resemblance to the Stonehenge monument in England, which is believed to be a Druid temple. This feature's name was officially adopted in 1963 by the U.S. Board on Geographic Names.

Geology
This geological feature is an eroded fin composed of Cedar Mesa Sandstone, which is the remains of coastal sand dunes deposited about 245–286 million years ago, during the early Permian period. The top of the formation rises 450 feet above the canyon floor, and two keyhole openings have a height of 85 feet, and a width of 20 feet.

Climate
Spring and fall are the most favorable seasons to experience Druid Arch. According to the Köppen climate classification system, it is located in a Cold semi-arid climate zone, which is defined by the coldest month having an average mean temperature below −0 °C (32 °F) and at least 50% of the total annual precipitation being received during the spring and summer.

Gallery

See also
 Colorado Plateau
 Geology of Utah

References

External links

 Canyonlands National Park National Park Service
 Druid Arch Weather forecast
 Druid Arch: YouTube

Landforms of San Juan County, Utah
Natural arches of San Juan County, Utah
Natural arches of Utah
Colorado Plateau
Canyonlands National Park
Sandstone formations of the United States